The Orbiting Astronomical Observatory 2 (OAO-2, nicknamed Stargazer) was the first successful space telescope (first space telescope being OAO-1, which failed to operate once in orbit), launched on December 7, 1968. An Atlas-Centaur rocket launched it into a nearly circular  altitude Earth orbit. Data was collected in ultraviolet on many sources including comets, planets, and galaxies. It had two major instrument sets facing in opposite directions; the Smithsonian Astrophysical Observatory (SAO) and the Wisconsin Experiment Package (WEP).  One discovery was large halos of hydrogen gas around comets, and it also observed Nova Serpentis, which was a nova discovered in 1970.

Celescope: Smithsonian Astrophysical Observatory

The Smithsonian Astrophysical Observatory, also called Celescope, had four 12 inch (30.5 cm) Schwarzschild telescopes that fed into Uvicons. The Uvicon was an ultra-violet light detector based on the  Westinghouse Vidicon. Ultraviolet light was converted into electrons which were in turn converted to a voltage as those electrons hit the detection area of the tube. There has been a Uvicon in the collection of the Smithsonian Institution since 1973.

Various filters, photocathodes, and electronics aided in collecting data in several ultraviolet light passbands. The detectors showed a gradual loss of sensitivity and the experiment was turned off in April 1970.  By the time it finished about 10 percent of the sky was observed resulting in a catalog of 5,068 UV stars.

Wisconsin Experiment Package 

The Wisconsin Experiment Package had seven different telescopes for ultraviolet observations. For example, there was a nebular photoelectric photometer fed by a 16-inch (40.64 cm) telescope with a six-position filter wheel that unfortunately failed a few weeks after launch. 

Construction was supervised by Arthur Code of the University of Wisconsin-Madison.   WEP observed over 1200 targets in ultraviolet light before the mission ended in early 1973.

Discoveries 

In addition to the Celescope's catalog of UV stars, the WEP observed comet Tago-Sato-Kosaka and found it to be surrounded by a cloud of hydrogen, confirming that the comet was largely made up of water, and detected the 2175-angstrom bump, an increase in UV absorption at that wavelength that is still not fully explained.

Spacecraft bus 
The observatory was built in the shape of an octagonal prism.

See also

 Orbiting Astronomical Observatory
 Orbiting Solar Observatory

References

External links
 OAO 2 observations of the Alpha Persei cluster
OAO-2 Info and pics
50th Anniversary Overview of OAO-2 including video

Ultraviolet telescopes
Spacecraft launched in 1968